This is a list of notable synagogues in Moldova.

Chișinău
Alte Shul Synagogue, Chișinău
Central Synagogue Chabad, Chișinău
Kishinev Choral Synagogue, Chișinău
Sinagoga Sticlarilor (Glassmakers’ Synagogue), Chișinău
Synagogue Chofetz Chaim, Chișinău

Orhei
Orhei Synagogue, Orhei

Soroca
Sinagoga, Soroca

Tiraspol
Keren, Tiraspol

References

External links
Moldova, JGuideEurope

Moldova
Synagogues
Jews and Judaism in Moldova
Synagogues